En el nombre del hijo (In the Name of the Son) is a 1987 Argentine drama film written and directed by Jorge Polaco. It won a Golden Dolphin in the 1988 Festróia - Tróia International Film Festival.

Plot summary 
The movie follows the incestuous relationship between Bobby, a doll repairer, and his possessive mother. They are shown to bathe together, sleep together and engage in sexual intercourse as well. In turn, she is jealous of his suggestive relationship with his customers, mostly little girls. The film works as a portrait of sorts, depicting a man confused about his sexual identity, and the overprotecting mother that abuses him while she, in turn, seeks to relive the days of her youth. In the end, Bobby kills his mother and dresses up like her.

References

External links 
 

1987 films
Argentine drama films
1980s Spanish-language films
1980s Argentine films